Tony Derrell Smith (born June 29, 1970) is a former professional American football player who played running back for three seasons for the Atlanta Falcons. Smith is known for supposedly being the player the Falcons drafted with the pick they acquired for Brett Favre in a trade with the Green Bay Packers. Contrary to popular belief, Smith was not drafted with the pick but rather another pick the Falcons had at their disposal.

Southern Mississippi 
A receiver turned running back, Smith rushed for 1,703 yards at Southern Mississippi and scored 12 touchdowns in three seasons. Favre was Smith's quarterback the first two seasons of his college career.

NFL career 
Smith was chosen in the first round (19th overall) in the 1992 NFL Draft by the Falcons. Legend has it that Atlanta acquired this pick from Green Bay in exchange for Brett Favre, but Favre was actually traded for the 17th pick in the 1992 draft. Atlanta later traded this pick to the Dallas Cowboys. Atlanta received the 19th pick in the draft, which they used to draft Smith.
 Falcons Head Coach Jerry Glanville wanted the team to draft a defensive back and was unhappy with the choice of a running back.

Smith got to his first training camp late, after a five-day holdout. He signed a $2.5 million contract, which was the richest in team history at the time. During his rookie season, he led the team with 87 carries and began returning kicks and punts.

But by his second year, still not in the favor of Glanville, Smith never played an offensive snap. The same thing happened the following season and Smith found himself a free agent after the 1994 season.

Smith signed with the expansion Carolina Panthers, but broke his tibia and fibula in a preseason game against the Chicago Bears. He was placed on injured reserve and released the following offseason when his leg hadn't fully healed.

Smith spent a season in the Canadian Football League with the Toronto Argonauts as an attempt to revive his NFL career. He was signed the following offseason with the Philadelphia Eagles in 1999, but Smith's career was officially over after he "popped" his hamstring and the Eagles released him on May 4, 1999,

In a 2016 interview, Smith claimed to be at peace with his NFL career being labeled a "bust." "I didn't go into the game to be a bust on purpose," Smith said. "Sometimes, things just work out that way, you know. That's just what it was. Now, it's no big deal to me at this point. I've outgrown it."

References

External links
 

1970 births
Living people
Players of American football from Chicago
American football running backs
Southern Miss Golden Eagles football players
Atlanta Falcons players